Aghbolagh (also Romanized as Āghbolāgh; also known as Āqbolāgh and Āq Bolāgh) is a village in Baranduzchay-ye Jonubi Rural District, in the Central District of Urmia County, West Azerbaijan Province, Iran. At the 2006 census, its population was 335, in 47 families.

References 

Populated places in Urmia County